Cassinia monticola commonly known as mountain cassinia, is a species of flowering plant in the family Asteraceae and is endemic to mountain areas of south-eastern Australia. It is a spreading shrub with sticky, narrow linear to narrow lance-shaped leaves, and bronze-coloured to greenish-cream heads of flowers arranged in a dense, round-topped corymb.

Description
The heads are arranged in groups of several hundred in a dense, round-topped corymb  in diameter.

Taxonomy and naming
Cassinia maritima was first formally described in 2004 by Anthony Edward Orchard in Australian Systematic Botany from specimens collected near Thredbo in 2004. The specific epithet (monticola) means "dweller in mountains".

Distribution and habitat
Mountain cassinia grows in herbfield, grassland and shrubland in alpine and subalpine areas above  in the Snowy Mountains of southern New South Wales and mountain areas of north-eastern Victoria.

References

monticola
Asterales of Australia
Flora of New South Wales
Plants described in 2004
Flora of Victoria (Australia)
Flora of the Australian Capital Territory